The 2012 Challenge Trophy was hosted in Winnipeg, Manitoba. In the final Royal-Sélect de Beauport (Quebec) defeated Edmonton Scottish (Alberta).

Teams
 FC Winnipeg Lions
 Hellas FC
Royal-Sélect de Beauport
 PEI FC
 HUSA Alumni 
 Edmonton Scottish
 Holy Cross
 AEK London
Fredericton Picaroons
 Surrey United Firefighters
Halifax City
 Yellowknife FC

Finals

References

Challenge
Canadian National Challenge Cup